Net Optics is a manufacturer of network monitoring and intelligent access solutions for physical and virtual networks. The company was established in 1996 by Eldad Matityahu.  Ixia announced the purchase of Net Optics[11] on October 29, 2013.

Net Optics’ line of passive network monitoring access devices includes taps, bypass switches, regeneration taps, aggregators, data monitoring switches, and media converters. Products are designed and manufactured in the United States.  Net Optics' Network Performance Monitoring and Application Flow Monitoring solutions extend visibility and control into the application layer.

Ixia was then purchased by Keysight formerly Agilent, formerly HP.

History 
Net Optics was founded in 1996 by Eldad Matityahu.  The company’s original focus was producing network taps - hardware devices that monitor network traffic.  Net Optics now offers a range of network monitoring solutions for telecommunications, banking, finance, government and large enterprise. In 2011, Net Optics introduced the Phantom Virtual Tap, granting users 100% visibility in monitoring virtual network environments.
  
In January 2012, Net Optics announced its entry into the Network Performance Monitoring (NPM)/ Application Performance Monitoring (APM) arena with the acquisition of Triplelayer, a private Australia-based distributor, and its sister company, nMetrics, which specializes in network and application analysis software. The first solution featuring the companies’ combined strengths, called the appTap, offers visibility and analytics for remote and branch offices. The company’s Network Performance Monitoring family, called Spyke, extends Net Optics' Access Switching capabilities via an integrated solution that offers application intelligence (statistics, analysis) through deep packet inspection.

Net Optics and Triplelayer have an eight-year history of joint deployments for global telecommunications providers, financial services firms and enterprises across the Asia-Pacific (APAC) region. Triplelayer has been the primary distributor of Net Optics products in APAC since 2010.

Net Optics works with various companies to produce compatible products for their respective industries. Net Optics is currently working with Cisco Systems, F5 Networks, TippingPoint, Oracle, Palo Alto Networks, Hewlett Packard, McAfee, and Imperva.

References

Manufacturing companies of the United States
Networking hardware
Companies established in 1996